Jack DeWayne Clay (October 20, 1926 – September 2, 2019) was an American acting teacher, director and actor.

A graduate of the Northwestern University school of speech under Alvina Krause, Clay taught at Oberlin College (1956 - 1957), University of Miami (1957 - 1961), and the University of South Florida (1961 - 1966).  He also headed the Professional Actors Training Programs at Southern Methodist University (1966 - 1986) and the University of Washington (1986 - 1991.)  While in Dallas, he founded "Stage #1," a professional acting company, and served as its artistic director for eight years.  
 
Clay's teachers included Lee Strasberg, Martha Graham and Eric Hawkins. Among his best-known students were Kathy Bates, Powers Boothe, Patricia Richardson, Stephen Tobolowsky, Beth Henley and Christopher Evan Welch.

Clay was also a distinguished member of the College of Fellows of the American Theatre.

Clay died on September 2, 2019, in Seattle.

References

Further reading

1926 births
2019 deaths
American male actors
Male actors from Illinois
Northwestern University School of Communication alumni
Oberlin College faculty
People from Decatur, Illinois
Southern Methodist University faculty
University of Miami faculty
University of South Florida faculty
University of Washington faculty